David Cappo AO (born 2 November 1949) is a social policy and reform advocate and Roman Catholic priest based in Adelaide, South Australia. As well as his ongoing work in Australia, Cappo is an advisor on programs in the United States to reduce homelessness and develop local solutions to social problems.

Cappo was previously the Social Inclusion Commissioner for the State of South Australia, while also serving as Vicar General of the Roman Catholic Archdiocese of Adelaide.

In 2007, Cappo was appointed Officer of the Order of Australia for service to social inclusion in South Australia.

Early life
Cappo was born in Adelaide and educated at St Joseph's Primary School at Kingswood and at Rostrevor College.

While completing a Bachelor of Arts in Social Work at the South Australian Institute of Technology (now University of South Australia), Cappo worked as a community welfare officer in the areas of child protection, family support and juvenile offending.

Cappo was ordained a Catholic Priest in 1984 and served as parish priest of Hectorville, South Australia, from 1996-2000.

Career
In 2002, Cappo became Vicar General of the Roman Catholic Archdiocese of Adelaide and was made a Prelate of Honour by Pope John Paul II, an appointment accompanied by the title of Monsignor.

In the same year, the then Premier Mike Rann appointed him Chair of South Australia's Social Inclusion Board. In 2006 he was named Social Inclusion Commissioner.

Cappo was also appointed an independent advisor to the Executive Committee of State Cabinet and a member of the South Australian Economic Development Board.

Cappo worked with the Government in directing the implementation of the South Australian Strategic Plan, with particular emphasis on social targets and outcomes, and produced an innovative form of governance that brought Government departments together to provide a more effective delivery of social programs. This model received supportive comments from the World Health Organization (WHO) Social Determinants of Health Report 2008.

Cappo also advised the Australian Government on social policy and mental health reform and was appointed Deputy Chair of the national Social Inclusion Board in 2008 by then Prime Minister Kevin Rudd.

In 2006, Rudd's successor Julia Gillard appointed Cappo to a national role in mental health. In late 2011, Cappo stepped down from this position, and from his role with the Social Inclusion Board, after a political controversy sparked by allegations that he and Archbishop Philip Wilson failed to properly investigate allegations involving another South Australian priest in the 1960s. A subsequent investigation by a QC found there was no substance to the allegations.

In 2012, Cappo was appointed a senior research fellow in the School of Social and Policy Studies at Flinders University.

Achievements
Cappo's policy achievements as Social Inclusion Commissioner included:

 A reduction in rough sleeper homelessness in inner-city Adelaide by 50%
 An increase in school retention rates from 67.2% in 1999 to 84.2% in 2010
 Total reform of the mental health system to a community-based, stepped system of care
 A blueprint for total reform of the disability system

Notes

People from Adelaide
Living people
Officers of the Order of Australia
1949 births